The Main Street Historic District of Westerly, Rhode Island, encompasses a predominantly residential section of Main Street and adjoining Maple Avenue and School Street.  The district includes nineteen houses, which are predominantly Greek Revival, Italianate, and Second Empire in style, as well as the Pawcatuck Seventh Day Baptist Church, a Greek Revival structure built 1847–48.

The district was listed on the National Register of Historic Places in 1978.

See also
National Register of Historic Places listings in Washington County, Rhode Island

References

Westerly, Rhode Island
Historic districts in Washington County, Rhode Island
Historic districts on the National Register of Historic Places in Rhode Island